Spencer King may refer to:

Spencer Matthews King (born 1917), American diplomat
Charles Spencer King (born 1925), commonly known as Spencer King, British automobile engineer